The Tal Memorial is an annual chess tournament played in Moscow from 2006 to 2018 with the exception of 2015, to honour the memory of the former World Champion Mikhail Tal (1936–1992).

Many of the world's strongest players compete. In 2014 it was held only as a blitz tournament and the classical event was replaced by the TASHIR Petrosian Memorial. It returned in October 2016.

Format
The inaugural Tal Memorial was held as a ten-player single round robin event with a classical time control of two hours for the first 40 moves, one hour for the next 20 moves, then 15 minutes for the rest of the game and 30 seconds added per move from move 60. The time control changed for subsequent editions to 100 minutes for 40 moves, then 50 minutes for the next 20 moves, then 15 minutes with 30 seconds added per move from move one. Draws could not be agreed before move 40.

For 2012 and 2013, a round-robin blitz tournament was held in order to decide the pairings for the main event with time control of 3 minutes plus two seconds per move. In 2014, the classical part did not take place and the Tal Memorial became solely a blitz tournament with the time control of 4 minutes plus 2 seconds per move in a double round robin of twelve players.

In case of a tie the placings were decided by: number of games played with Black, number of wins, direct encounter, Koja co-efficient and Sonneborn-Berger score. In 2010 Levon Aronian and Sergey Karjakin shared the title as their tiebreaks were all equal.

Tournament winners

Results

2006
{| class="wikitable" style="text-align: center;"
|+ 1st Tal Memorial, 6–16 November 2006, Moscow, Russia, Category XX (2727)
! !! Player !! Rating !! 1 !! 2 !! 3 !! 4 !! 5 !! 6 !! 7 !! 8 !! 9 !! 10 !! Points !! SB !! TPR
|-
|-style="background:#ccffcc;"
| 1 || align=left| || 2741 ||  || ½ || ½ || 1 || ½ || ½ || ½ || ½ || ½ || 1 ||5½ || 23.75 || 2806
|-
| 2 || align=left| || 2703 || ½ ||  || ½ || ½ || ½ || 1 || ½ || ½ || ½ || 1 ||5½ || 23.50 || 2810
|-
| 3 || align=left| || 2741 || ½ || ½ ||  || ½ || ½ || ½ || 0 || 1 || 1 || 1 ||5½ || 22.50 || 2806
|-
| 4 || align=left| || 2733 || 0 || ½ || ½ ||  || ½ || ½ || 1 || ½ || 1 || ½ ||5 ||  || 2769
|-
| 5 || align=left| || 2728 || ½ || ½ || ½ || ½ ||  || ½ || ½ || ½ || ½ || ½ ||4½ || 20.25 || 2727
|-
| 6 || align=left| || 2710 || ½ || 0 || ½ || ½ || ½ ||  || 1 || 1 || ½ || 0 ||4½ || 20.00 || 2729
|-
| 7 || align=left| || 2750 || ½ || ½ || 1 || 0 || ½ || 0 ||  || ½ || ½ || 1 ||4½ || 19.75 || 2725
|-
| 8 || align=left| || 2720 || ½ || ½ || 0 || ½ || ½ || 0 || ½ ||  || ½ || ½ ||3½ || 15.75 || 2648
|-
| 9 || align=left| || 2698 || ½ || ½ || 0 || 0 || ½ || ½ || ½ || ½ ||  || ½ ||3½ || 15.50 || 2650
|-
| 10 || align=left| || 2747 || 0 || 0 || 0 || ½ || ½ || 1 || 0 || ½ || ½ ||  ||3 ||  || 2600
|}

 Jobava,  Karjakin (both — 12 points out of 18),  Radjabov,  Jakovenko,  Bologan and  Timofeev (all — 11½ out of 18) qualified as the winners of 40-players 9-round (two games per round) qualification tournament taken place 16-17 November 2006.

{| class="wikitable" style="text-align: center;"
|+ 1st Tal Memorial Blitz Cup, 18-19 November 2006, Moscow, Russia
! !! Player !! Rating !! 1 !! 2 !! 3 !! 4 !! 5 !! 6 !! 7 !! 8 !! 9 !! 10 !! 11 !! 12 !! 13 !! 14 !! 15 !! 16 !! 17 !! 18 !! Points !! SB
|-
| 1 || align=left| || 2779 ||  || 1 || 1½ || 1½ || 1½ || 1½ || 1½ || 1 || 1 || 1½ || 1 || 1 || 1½ || 1½ || 1 || 1½ || 1½ || 2 || 23 ||
|-
| 2 || align=left| || 2741 || 1 ||  || 1½ || ½ || 2 || 1½ || 1 || 2 || 1½ || 1 || 0 || 1 || 1 || 1 || 1 || 1 || 2 || 2 || 21 ||
|- 
| 3 || align=left| || 2729 || ½ || ½ ||  || 1 || ½ || 1 || 1 || 1½ || 1 || 2 || 2 || 1 || 1 || 1 || 1½ || 1½ || 2 || 1½ || 20½ || 324.75
|-
| 4 || align=left|  || 2750 || ½ || 1½ || 1 ||  || 0 || ½ || 0 || 2 || 1½ || 1½ || ½ || 2 || ½ || 1½ || 2 || 1½ || 2 || 2 || 20½ || 321.50
|- 
| 5 || align=left| || 2703 || ½ || 0 || 1½ || 2 ||  || 1 || ½ || 1 || 2 || ½ || 1½ || 1 || 1½ || 1 || 1½ || 1½ || 1½ || 1 || 19½ ||
|-
| 6 || align=left| || 2747 || ½ || ½ || 1 || 1½ || 1 ||  || 1½ || 1 || 1 || 2 || 1 || 1 || 1½ || ½ || 1½ || 0 || 1½ || 1 || 18 || 305.25
|-
| 7 || align=left| || 2710 || ½ || 1 || 1 || 2 || 1½ || ½ ||  || 1 || 0 || 0 || 1 || 1 || 1½ || ½ || 1½ || 1 || 2 || 2 || 18 || 289.75
|-
| 8 || align=left| || 2733 || 1 || 0 || ½ || 0 || 1 || 1 || 1 ||  || 1 || 1½ || 1 || 1 || 1 || 1 || 1½ || 1½ || 2 || 2 || 18 || 277.00
|-
| 9 || align=left| || 2698 || 1 || ½ || 1 || ½ || 0 || 1 || 2 || 1 ||  || 1 || ½ || ½ || 2 || 1 || 1½ || 1½ || ½ || 2 || 17½ || 283.25
|-
| 10 || align=left| || 2668 || ½ || 1 || 0 || ½ || 1½ || 0 || 2 || ½ || 1 ||  || ½ || 2 || 1 || 1 || 1½ || 1½ || 1½ || 1½ || 17½ || 278.00
|-
| 11 || align=left| || 2672 || 1 || 2 || 0 || 1½ || ½ || 1 || 1 || 1 || 1½ || 1½ ||  || 0 || ½ || 2 || ½ || 1 || 1 || 1 || 17 || 290.75
|-
| 12 || align=left| || 2728 || 1 || 1 || 1 || 0 || 1 || 1 || 1 || 1 || 1½ || 0 || 2 ||  || 1 || 1 || 1 || 2 || 1 || ½ || 17 || 282.75
|-
| 13 || align=left| || 2710 || ½ || 1 || 1 || 1½ || ½ || ½ || ½ || 1 || 0 || 1 || 1½ || 1 ||  || 1 || 1 || 2 || 2 || 1 || 17 || 271.50
|-
| 14 || align=left| || 2741 || ½ || 1 || 1 || ½ || 1 || 1½ || 1½ || 1 || 1 || 1 || 0 || 1 || 1 ||  || 1 || 1½ || 1 || 1 || 16½ ||
|-
| 15 || align=left| || 2671 || 1 || 1 || ½ || 0 || ½ || ½ || ½ || ½ || ½ || ½ || 1½ || 1 || 1 || 1 ||  || 2 || 1½ || 2 || 15½ ||
|-
| 16 || align=left| || 2659 || ½ || 1 || ½ || ½ || ½ || 2 || 1 || ½ || ½ || ½ || 1 || 0 || 0 || ½ || 0 ||  || ½ || 1 || 10½ ||
|-
| 17 || align=left| || 2662 || ½ || 0 || 0 || 0 || ½ || ½ || 0 || 0 || 1½ || ½ || 1 || 1 || 0 || 1 || ½ || 1½ ||  || 1½ || 10 ||
|-
| 18 || align=left| || 2650 || 0 || 0 || ½ || 0 || 1 || 1 || 0 || 0 || 0 || ½ || 1 || 1½ || 1 || 1 || 0 || 1 || ½ ||  || 9 ||
|}

2007
{| class="wikitable" style="text-align: center;"
|+ 2nd Tal Memorial, 10–19 November 2007, Moscow, Russia, Category XX (2742)
! !! Player !! Rating !! 1 !! 2 !! 3 !! 4 !! 5 !! 6 !! 7 !! 8 !! 9 !! 10 !! Points !! TPR
|-
|-style="background:#ccffcc;"
| 1 || align=left| || 2785 ||  || 1 || ½ || ½ || ½ || 1 || ½ || ½ || 1 || 1 ||6½ || 2902
|-
| 2 || align=left| || 2739 || 0 ||  || ½ || 1 || ½ || 0 || ½ || 1 || ½ || 1 ||5 || 2784
|-
| 3-6 || align=left| || 2736 || ½ || ½ ||  || ½ || ½ || ½ || ½ || ½ || ½ || ½ ||4½ || 2741
|-
| 3-6 || align=left| || 2714 || ½ || 0 || ½ ||  || 1 || ½ || ½ || ½ || ½ || ½ ||4½ || 2744
|-
| 3-6 || align=left| || 2710 || ½ || ½ || ½ || 0 ||  || ½ || ½ || 1 || ½ || ½ ||4½ || 2744
|-
| 3-6 || align=left| || 2755 || 0 || 1 || ½ || ½ || ½ ||  || ½ || ½ || ½ || ½ ||4½ || 2739
|-
| 7-9 || align=left| || 2787 || ½ || ½ || ½ || ½ || ½ || ½ ||  || ½ || 0 || ½ ||4 || 2693
|-
| 7-9 || align=left| || 2714 || ½ || 0 || ½ || ½ || 0 || ½ || ½ ||  || 1 || ½ ||4 || 2701
|-
| 7-9 || align=left| || 2752 || 0 || ½ || ½ || ½ || ½ || ½ || 1 || 0 ||  || ½ ||4 || 2697
|-
| 10 || align=left| || 2716 || 0 || 0 || ½ || ½ || ½ || ½ || ½ || ½ || ½ ||  ||3½ || 2664
|}

2008
{| class="wikitable" style="text-align: center;"
|+ 3rd Tal Memorial, 19–28 August 2008, Moscow, Russia, Category XX (2745)
! !! Player !! Rating !! 1 !! 2 !! 3 !! 4 !! 5 !! 6 !! 7 !! 8 !! 9 !! 10 !! Points !! TPR
|-
|-style="background:#ccffcc;"
| 1 || align=left| || 2781 ||  || 1 || ½ || ½ || ½ || 1 || 1 || ½ || ½ || ½ ||6 || 2866
|-
| 2 || align=left| || 2788 || 0 ||  || 1 || 1 || ½ || ½ || 0 || 1 || ½ || ½ ||5 || 2783
|-
| 3 || align=left| || 2718 || ½ || 0 ||  || ½ || ½ || 1 || ½ || ½ || ½ || 1 ||5 || 2791
|-
| 4 || align=left| || 2788 || ½ || 0 || ½ ||  || ½ || ½ || ½ || 1 || ½ || 1 ||5 || 2783
|-
| 5 || align=left| || 2720 || ½ || ½ || ½ || ½ ||  || ½ || ½ || ½ || 1 || ½ ||5 || 2791
|-
| 6 || align=left| || 2741 || 0 || ½ || 0 || ½ || ½ ||  || 1 || ½ || ½ || 1 ||4½ || 2745
|-
| 7 || align=left| || 2723 || 0 || 1 || ½ || ½ || ½ || 0 ||  || ½ || 0 || 1 ||4 || 2704
|-
| 8 || align=left| || 2708 || ½ || 0 || ½ || 0 || ½ || ½ || ½ ||  || 1 || ½ ||4 || 2706
|-
| 9 || align=left| || 2742 || ½ || ½ || ½ || ½ || 0 || ½ || 1 || 0 ||  || 0 ||3½ || 2665
|-
| 10 || align=left| || 2741 || ½ || ½ || 0 || 0 || ½ || 0 || 0 || ½ || 1 ||  ||3 || 2620
|}

 Grischuk,  Movsesian (both — 12½ points out of 18),  Grachev,  Karjakin and  Eljanov (all — 12 out of 18) qualified as the winners of 60-players qualification blitz tournament taken place 27-28 August 2008.  Carlsen and  Karpov were invited by the organizers.

{| class="wikitable" style="text-align: center;"
|+ 3rd Tal Memorial Blitz, 29–30 August 2008, Moscow, Cat. XX (2726)
! !! Player !! Rating !! Points !! TPR
|-
| 1 || align=left| || 2781 || 23½ || 2863
|-
| 2 || align=left| || 2788 || 22½ || 2839
|-
| 3 || align=left| || 2775 || 21 || 2810
|-
| 4 || align=left| || 2738 || 20 || 2790
|-
| 5 || align=left| || 2742 || 20 || 2790 
|-
| 6 || align=left| || 2741 || 18 || 2746
|-
| 7 || align=left| || 2728 || 18 || 2747
|-
| 8 || align=left| || 2727 || 18 || 2747
|-
| 9 || align=left| || 2723 || 17½ || 2733
|-
| 10 || align=left| || 2720 || 17½ || 2733
|-
| 11 || align=left| || 2718 || 17 || 2726
|-
| 12 || align=left| || 2640 || 14½ || 2681
|-
| 13 || align=left| || 2708 || 14 || 2662
|-
| 14 || align=left| || 2651 || 14 || 2665
|-
| 15 || align=left| || 2788 || 14 || 2657
|-
| 16 || align=left| || 2723 || 12½ || 2631
|-
| 17 || align=left| || 2716 || 12½ || 2631
|-
| 18 || align=left| || 2664 || 11½ || 2612
|}

2009
The 2009 competition was held from 5 to 14 November, with 10 of the 13 highest rated players participating: Viswanathan Anand, then the World Champion, Levon Aronian, Vladimir Kramnik, former world champion, Magnus Carlsen, the world champion of 2013, Peter Leko, Vasyl Ivanchuk, Boris Gelfand, Alexander Morozevich, Ruslan Ponomariov and Peter Svidler. The Elo average was 2761 (Category XXI), which was the highest ever reached by the tournament, trailing only the 2011, 2012, and 2013 tournaments. It was won solidly by Vladimir Kramnik with a +3 score, i.e. three wins and six draws. Ivanchuk and Carlsen shared second place with +2.

2010
The 2010 competition was held from 4 to 18 November, at the GUM Exhibition Hall in Red Square, Moscow. Many of the world's top players participated: in order of Elo rating, Levon Aronian, Vladimir Kramnik, Alexander Grischuk, Shakhriyar Mamedyarov, Sergey Karjakin, Pavel Eljanov, Boris Gelfand, Hikaru Nakamura, Alexei Shirov, and Wang Hao. Aronian and Karjakin shared first place with 5½/9. Mamedyarov scored the same number of points, but due to his loss to Gelfand was awarded third place on tie-break. The average Elo was 2757 (Category XXI).

2011

The 2011 competition was held from 16 to 25 November. Magnus Carlsen, Viswanathan Anand, Levon Aronian and Vladimir Kramnik; all four rated 2800+ at the time of the tournament participated. Seven out of the world's top ten players participated in the tournament, and its average Elo of 2776 (Category 22) was at the time the highest in history. Both Magnus Carlsen and Levon Aronian finished on 5½/9 (a +2 score, two wins and seven draws). Due to the tie-break rules of the tournament Magnus Carlsen was declared the winner because he played the black pieces five times, while Levon Aronian played the black pieces only four times.

2012
The Tal Memorial 2012 took place from 7 to 18 June 2012, with participants Magnus Carlsen, Levon Aronian, Vladimir Kramnik, Teimour Radjabov, Alexander Grischuk, Hikaru Nakamura, Fabiano Caruana, Alexander Morozevich, Evgeny Tomashevsky and Luke McShane.  This tournament was a Category 22 event (average Elo rating of 2776.4). A blitz chess tournament on June 7 preceded the main with a separate prize fund to determine the numbering of the players in the main tournament.

{| class="wikitable" style="text-align: center;"
|+ 7th Tal Memorial Blitz, 7 June 2012, Moscow, Russia
! !! Player !! Rating !! 1 !! 2 !! 3 !! 4 !! 5 !! 6 !! 7 !! 8 !! 9 !! 10 !! Points !!  !! Wins !!  !! Koya
|-
| 1 || align=left|
| 2769 ||  || 1 || 1 || ½ || 0 || ½ || ½ || 1 || 1 || 1 || 6½|| 5 || || ||
|-
| 2 || align=left|
| 2835 || 0 ||  || 1 || 1 || 0 || ½ || 1 || 1 || 1 || 1 || 6½|| 4 ||  || ||
|-
| 3 || align=left|
| 2761 || 0 || 0 ||  || ½ || ½ || 1 || 1 || 1 || ½ || 1 || 5½|| 5 ||  || ||
|-
| 4 || align=left|
| 2784 || ½ || 0 || ½ ||  || 1 || 1 || 1 || 1 || 0 || ½ || 5½|| 4 || || ||
|-
| 5 || align=left|
| 2825 || 1 || 1 || ½ || 0 ||  || ½ || ½ || ½ || 1 || 0 || 5|| 4 || 3 || ½ || 18.25
|-
| 6 || align=left|
| 2775 || ½ || ½ || 0 || 0 || ½ ||  || ½ || 1 || 1 || 1 || 5|| 4 || 3 || ½ || 9.00
|-
| 7 || align=left|
| 2738 || ½ || 0 || 0 || 0 || ½ || ½ ||  || 0 || 1 || 1 || 3½||  ||  ||  || 
|-
| 8 || align=left|
| 2706 || 0 || 0 || 0 || 0 || ½ || 0 || 1 ||  || 1 || ½ || 3||  ||  || || 
|-
| 9 || align=left|
| 2801 || 0 || 0 || ½ || 1 || 0 || 0 || 0 || 0 ||  || 1 || 2½||  ||  || ||
|-
| 10 || align=left|
| 2770 || 0 || 0 || 0 || ½ || 1 || 0 || 0 || ½ || 0 ||  || 2|| || || || 
|}

{| class="wikitable" style="text-align: center;"
|+ 7th Tal Memorial, 8–19 June 2012, Moscow, Russia, Category XXII (2777)
! !! Player !! Rating !! 1 !! 2 !! 3 !! 4 !! 5 !! 6 !! 7 !! 8 !! 9 !! 10 !! Points !!  !! Wins !!  !! Koya !! TPR
|-
|-style="background:#ccffcc;"
| 1 || align=left|
| 2835 ||  || ½ || 1 || ½ || ½ || ½ || ½ || 1 || ½ || ½ || 5½|| || || || || 2850
|-
| 2 || align=left|
| 2770 || ½ ||  || ½ || 1 || 0 || 0 || ½ || 1 || ½ || 1 || 5|| 5 || 3 || || || 2820
|-
| 3 || align=left|
| 2784 || 0 || ½ ||  || ½ || ½ || ½ || ½ || 1 || ½ || 1 || 5|| 4 || 2 || || || 2819
|-
| 4 || align=left|
| 2801 || ½ || 0 || ½ ||  || ½ || ½ || 1 || 0 || ½ || 1 || 4½|| 5 || || || || 2774
|-
| 5 || align=left|
| 2769 || ½ || 1 || ½ || ½ ||  || 1 || 1 || 0 || 0 || 0 || 4½|| 4 || 3 || || || 2777
|-
| 6 || align=left|
| 2825 || ½ || 1 || ½ || ½ || 0 ||  || ½ || 0 || 1 || ½ || 4½|| 4 || 2 || ½ || 2 || 2771
|-
| 7 || align=left|
| 2761 || ½ || ½ || ½ || 0 || 0 || ½ ||  || 1 || 1 || ½ || 4½|| 4 || 2 || ½ || 1½ || 2778
|-
| 8 || align=left|
| 2706 || 0 || 0 || 0 || 1 || 1 || 1 || 0 ||  || ½ || ½ || 4|| 5 || 3 || || || 2741
|-
| 9 || align=left|
| 2775 || ½ || ½ || ½ || ½ || 1 || 0 || 0 || ½ ||  || ½ || 4|| 5 || 1 || || || 2734
|-
| 10 || align=left|
| 2738 || ½ || 0 || 0 || 0 || 1 || ½ || ½ || ½ || ½ ||  || 3½|| || || || || 2701
|}

2013
The Tal Memorial 2013 took place from 13 to 24 June 2013, with participants Magnus Carlsen, Vladimir Kramnik, Viswanathan Anand, Hikaru Nakamura, Sergey Karjakin, Fabiano Caruana, Alexander Morozevich, Boris Gelfand, Shakhriyar Mamedyarov, and Dmitry Andreikin. As in 2011, seven of the world's top ten players participated.  The Elo average for the tournament is 2777, making it a Category 22 event and one of the highest rated tournaments of all time. A blitz chess tournament on June 12 preceded the main event with a separate prize fund to determine the numbering of the players in the main tournament.

{| class="wikitable" style="text-align:center;"
|+ 8th Tal Memorial Blitz, 12 June 2013, Moscow, Russia
! !! Player !! Blitz rating !! 1 !! 2 !! 3 !! 4 !! 5 !! 6 !! 7 !! 8 !! 9 !! 10 !! Points !!  !! Wins !! 
|-
| 1 || align=left |  || 2844
|  || ½ || ½ || ½ || ½ || 1 || 1 || 1 || 1 || 1 || 7 || || ||
|-
| 2 || align=left |  || 2786 
| ½ ||  || ½ || ½ || ½ || 1 || 1 || 1 || 1 || ½ || 6½ || || ||
|-
| 3 || align=left |  || 2752
| ½ || ½ ||  || ½ || ½ || 1 || ½ || 0 || 1 || 1 || 5½ || || ||
|-
| 4 || align=left |  || 2694
| ½ || ½ || ½ ||  || ½ || 1 || 0 || 1 || ½ || 0 || 4½ || 5 || || 
|-
| 5 || align=left |  || 2856
| ½ || ½ || ½ || ½ ||  || ½ || 0 || 1 || 0 || 1 || 4½ || 4 || ||
|-
| 6 || align=left |  || 2824
| 0 || 0 || 0 || 0 || ½ ||  || 1 || ½ || 1 || 1 || 4 || 5 || 3 || 1
|-
| 7 || align=left |  || 2777
| 0 || 0 || ½ || 1 || 1 || 0 ||  || ½ || 0 || 1 || 4 || 5 || 3 || 0
|-
| 8 || align=left |  || 2873
| 0 || 0 || 1 || 0 || 0 || ½ || ½ ||  || ½ || 1 || 3½ || || ||
|-
| 9 || align=left |  || 2756
| 0 || 0 || 0 || ½ || 1 || 0 || 1 || ½ ||  || 0 || 3 || || ||
|-
| 10 || align=left |  || 2718
| 0 || ½ || 0 || 1 || 0 || 0 || 0 || 0 || 1 ||  || 2½ || || ||
|}

{| class="wikitable" style="text-align:center;"
|+ 8th Tal Memorial, 13–23 June 2013, Moscow, Russia, Category XXII (2777)
! !! Player !! Rating !! 1 !! 2 !! 3 !! 4 !! 5 !! 6 !! 7 !! 8 !! 9 !! 10 !! Points !!  !! Wins !! TPR
|-
|-style="background:#ccffcc;"
| 1 || align=left |  || 2755 
|  || ½ || 1 || ½ || ½ || 1 || ½ || 1 || ½ || ½ || 6 || || || 2905
|-
| 2 || align=left |  || 2864  
| ½ ||  || 0 || ½ || ½ || 1 || ½ || ½ || 1 || 1 || 5½ || || || 2848
|-
| 3 || align=left |  || 2774
| 0 || 1 ||  || ½ || ½ || 0 || ½ || 1 || 1 || ½ || 5 || 5 || 3 || 2821
|-
| 4 || align=left |  || 2753 
| ½ || ½ || ½ ||  || ½ || 1 || ½ || ½ || ½ || ½ || 5 || 5 || 1 || 2823
|-
| 5 || align=left |  || 2713
| ½ || ½ || ½ || ½ ||  || ½ || ½ || ½ || ½ || 1 || 5 || 4 || || 2828
|-
| 6 || align=left |  || 2784
| 0 || 0 || 1 || 0 || ½ ||  || 1 || 0 || 1 || 1 || 4½ || || || 2777
|-
| 7 || align=left |  || 2782 
| ½ || ½ || ½ || ½ || ½ || 0 ||  || ½ || ½ || ½ || 4 || || || 2734
|-
| 8 || align=left |  || 2760 
| 0 || ½ || 0 || ½ || ½ || 1 || ½ ||  || 0 || ½ || 3½ || 5 || || 2699
|-
| 9 || align=left |  || 2786 
| ½ || 0 || 0 || ½ || ½ || 0 || ½ || 1 ||  || ½ || 3½ || 4 || || 2696
|-
| 10 || align=left |  || 2803 
| ½ || 0 || ½ || ½ || 0 || 0 || ½ || ½ || ½ ||  || 3 || || || 2650
|}

2014 
In 2014 the classical event was replaced by the TASHIR Petrosian Memorial, sponsored by Tashir Group, which took place from 3 to 11 November. This tournament was a category 20 event (average Elo rating of 2748) and it was won by Alexander Grischuk.

On 13 and 14 November the Tal Memorial Blitz tournament took place in Sochi, during the World Chess Championship 2014. It was a 12-player double round-robin event and it was won by Shakhriyar Mamedyarov.

{| class="wikitable" style="text-align:center;"
|+ 9th Tal Memorial, Blitz chess, 13–14 November 2014, Sochi, Krasnodar Krai, Russia
! !! Player !! Blitz rating !! 1 !! 2 !! 3 !! 4 !! 5 !! 6 !! 7 !! 8 !! 9 !! 10 !! 11 !! 12 !! Points !! 
|-
|-style="background:#ccffcc;"
| 1 || align=left |  || 2824
|  || 1 0 || 1 ½ || 1 1 || ½ 0 || ½ 0 || 1 0 || 1 1 || 1 1 || 1 ½ || 1 1 || 1 1 || 16 ||
|-
| 2 || align=left |  || 2724  
| 0 1 ||  || 1 ½ || 1 1 || 1 1 || 1 ½ || 1 ½ || 0 1|| ½ 0 || ½ ½ || 1 ½|| 1 1  || 15½ ||
|-
| 3 || align=left |  || 2719
| 0 ½ || 0 ½ ||  || ½ 1 || 0 1 || 0 0 || ½ ½ || 1 1 || ½ ½ || 1 1 || 1 0 || 1 1  || 12½ || 2½
|-
| 4 || align=left |  || 2701
| 0 0 || 0 0 || ½ 0 ||  || 1 ½ || ½ 1 || 0 1 || 0 1 || ½ 1 || 1 1 || ½ 1 || 1 1  || 12½ || 2
|-
| 5 || align=left |  || 2811
| ½ 1 || 0 0 || 1 0 || 0 ½ ||  || ½ 1 || 1 ½ || 1 0 || 0 ½ || 1 ½ || 1 ½ || 1 1  || 12½ || 1½
|-
| 6 || align=left |  || 2756
| ½ 1 || 0 ½ || 1 1 || ½ 0 || ½ 0 ||  || 1 0 || 0 0 || 1 1 || 0 0 || 1 1 || 1 1  || 12 ||
|-
| 7 || align=left |  || 2880 
| 0 1 || 0 ½ || ½ ½ || 1 0 || 0 ½ || 0 1 ||  || 0 1 || 1 ½ || 0 1 || 0 ½ || 1 1  || 11 ||
|-
| 8 || align=left |  || 2757
| 0 0 || 1 0 || 0 0 || 1 0 || 0 1 || 1 1 || 1 0 ||  || ½ ½ || ½ 1 || 0 1 || 0 1 || 10½ ||
|-
| 9 || align=left |  || 2682
| 0 0 || ½ 1 || ½ ½ || ½ 0 || 1 ½ || 0 0 || 0 ½ || ½ ½ ||  || ½ ½ || ½ ½ || 1 1  || 10 ||
|-
| 10 || align=left |  || 2648
| 0 ½ || ½ ½ || 0 0 || 0 0 || 0 ½ || 1 1 || 1 0 || ½ 0 || ½ ½ ||  || 0 1 || 1 1 || 9½ ||
|-
| 11 || align=left |  || 2725
| 0 0 || 0 ½ || 0 1 || ½ 0 || 0 ½ || 0 0 || 1 ½ || 1 0 || ½ ½ || 1 0 ||  || 1 0 || 8 ||
|-
| 12 || align=left |  || 2548 
| 0 0 || 0 0 || 0 0 || 0 0 || 0 0 || 0 0 || 0 0 || 1 0 || 0 0 || 0 0 || 0 1 ||  || 2 ||

|}

2016 
{| class="wikitable" style="text-align:center;"
|+10th Tal Memorial Blitz, 25 September 2016, Moscow, Russia
! !! Player !! Blitz rating !! 1 !! 2 !! 3 !! 4 !! 5 !! 6 !! 7 !! 8 !! 9 !! 10 !! Points !! 
|-
| 1 || align=left | || 2748
|  || 1 || 1 || ½ || ½ || 1 || 1 || 1 || 1 || ½ || 7½ ||
|-
| 2 || align=left |  || 2826
| 0 ||  || 1 || ½ || 0 || ½ || 1 || 1 || 1 || ½ || 5½ || 
|-
| 3 || align=left |  || 2840
| 0 || 0 ||  || ½ || 1 || ½ || 1 || 1 || ½ || ½ || 5 || 1½
|-
| 4 || align=left |  || 2795
| ½ || ½ || ½ ||  || ½ || 1 || 1 || 0 || ½ || ½ || 5 || 1
|-
| 5 || align=left |  || 2766
| ½ || 1 || 0 || ½ ||  || 0 || ½ || 1 || ½ || 1 || 5 || ½
|-
| 6 || align=left |  || 2713
| 0 || ½ || ½ || 0 || 1 ||  || 1 || ½ || ½ || ½ || 4½ || 
|-
| 7 || align=left |  || 2765
| 0 || 0 || 0 || 0 || ½ || 0 ||  || 1 || 1 || 1 || 3½ || 
|-
| 8 || align=left |  || 2793
| 0 || 0 || 0 || 1 || 0 || ½ || 0 ||  || 1 || ½ || 3 || 1½
|-
| 9 || align=left |  || 2624
| 0 || 0 || ½ || ½ || ½ || ½ || 0 || 0 ||  || 1 || 3 || 1
|-
| 10 || align=left |  || 2790
| ½ || ½ || ½ || ½ || 0 || ½ || 0 || ½ || 0 ||  || 3 || ½
|-
|}

{| class="wikitable" style="text-align:center;"
|+10th Tal Memorial, 26 September – 6 October 2016, Moscow, Russia, Category XXI (2760) 
! !! Player !! Rating !! 1 !! 2 !! 3 !! 4 !! 5 !! 6 !! 7 !! 8 !! 9 !! 10 !! Points !!  !! SB !! TPR
|-
|-style="background:#ccffcc;"
| 1 || align=left | || 2740
|  || ½ || ½ || ½ || ½ || ½ || 1 || 1 || 1 || ½ || 6 || || || 2887
|-
| 2 || align=left |  || 2755
| ½ ||  || 0 || ½ || 1 || ½ || ½ || ½ || 1 || 1 || 5½ || || || 2840
|-
| 3 || align=left |  || 2795
| ½ || 1 ||  || ½ || ½ || ½ || ½ || ½ || ½ || ½ || 5 || ½ || 22.75 || 2799
|-
| 4 || align=left |  || 2776
| ½ || ½ || ½ ||  || ½ || ½ || 0 || 1 || ½ || 1 || 5 || ½ || 21.00 || 2801
|-
| 5 || align=left |  || 2745
| ½ || 0 || ½ || ½ ||  || 1 || ½ || ½ || ½ || ½ || 4½ || || 19.75 || 2761
|-
| 6 || align=left |  || 2746
| ½ || ½ || ½ || ½ || 0 ||  || ½ || ½ || ½ || 1 || 4½ || || 19.00 || 2761
|-
| 7 || align=left |  || 2808
| 0 || ½ || ½ || 1 || ½ || ½ ||  || 0 || ½ || 1 || 4½ || || 18.50 || 2754
|-
| 8 || align=left |  || 2761
| 0 || ½ || ½ || 0 || ½ || ½ || 1 ||  || ½ || 1 || 4½ || || 18.00 || 2759
|-
| 9 || align=left |  || 2731
| 0 || 0 || ½ || ½ || ½ || ½ || ½ || ½ ||  || ½ || 3½ || || || 2683
|-
| 10 || align=left |  || 2743
| ½ || 0 || ½ || 0 || ½ || 0 || 0 || 0 || ½ ||  || 2 || || || 2541
|-
|}

2018 
{| class="wikitable" style="text-align: center;"
|+ 11th Tal Memorial, Rapid chess, 2–4 March 2018, Moscow, Russia
! !! Player !! Rapid rating !! 1 !! 2 !! 3 !! 4 !! 5 !! 6 !! 7 !! 8 !! 9 !! 10 !! Points !!  !! SB
|-
|-style="background:#ccffcc;"
| 1 || align=left| || 2805 ||  || 0 || ½ || 1 || ½ || 1 || ½ || 1 || ½ || 1 ||6 || ||
|-
| 2 || align=left| || 2755 || 1 ||  || ½ || ½ || ½ || ½ || ½ || 0 || 1 || ½ ||5 || 1½ || 22.75
|-
| 3 || align=left| || 2724 || ½ || ½ ||  || ½ || ½ || ½ || 1 || ½ || ½ || ½ ||5 || 1½ || 22.00
|-
| 4 || align=left| || 2820 || 0 || ½ || ½ ||  || 1 || ½ || 1 || 0 || ½ || 1 ||5 || 1½ || 21.00
|-
| 5 || align=left| || 2644 || ½ || ½ || ½ || 0 ||  || ½ || ½ || 1 || ½ || ½ ||4½ || ½ || 19.75
|-
| 6 || align=left| || 2792 || 0 || ½ || ½ || ½ || ½ ||  || 1 || ½ || ½ || ½ ||4½ || ½ || 19.25
|-
| 7 || align=left| || 2795 || ½ || ½ || 0 || 0 || ½ || 0 ||  || 1 || 1 || ½ ||4 || 1 ||
|-
| 8 || align=left| || 2663 || 0 || 1 || ½ || 1 || 0 || ½ || 0 ||  || ½ || ½ ||4 || 0 ||
|-
| 9 || align=left| || 2770 || ½ || 0 || ½ || ½ || ½ || ½ || 0 || ½ ||  || ½ ||3½ || ½ || 16.25
|-
| 10 || align=left| || 2803 || 0 || ½ || ½ || 0 || ½ || ½ || ½ || ½ || ½ ||  ||3½ || ½ || 15.25
|}

{| class="wikitable" style="text-align: center;"
|+ 11th Tal Memorial, Blitz chess, 5 March 2018, Moscow, Russia
! !! Player !!  Blitz rating !! 1 !! 2 !! 3 !! 4 !! 5 !! 6 !! 7 !! 8 !! 9 !! 10 !! 11 !! 12 !! 13 !! 14 !! Points !!  !! SB
|-
|-style="background:#ccffcc;"
| 1 || align=left| || 2868 ||  || 1 || 1 || 1 || 1 || 0 || 1 || ½ || ½ || 1 || 1 || ½ || ½ || 1 ||10 || ||
|-
| 2 || align=left| || 2842 || 0 ||  || 1 || ½ || 1 || 1 || ½ || 1 || ½ || ½ || ½ || ½ || ½ || 1 ||8½ || ||
|-
| 3 || align=left| || 2768 || 0 || 0 ||  || ½ || ½ || ½ || ½ || 0 || 1 || 1 || 1 || 1 || ½ || 1 ||7½ || ||
|-
| 4 || align=left| || 2834 || 0 || ½ || ½ ||  || 1 || 1 || 0 || 1 || 0 || 1 || 1 || 0 || ½ || ½ ||7 || 2 ||
|-
| 5 || align=left| || 2846 || 0 || 0 || ½ || 0 ||  || 1 || 1 || ½ || ½ || 1 || 0 || 1 || ½ || 1 ||7 || 1 ||
|-
| 6 || align=left| || 2784 || 1 || 0 || ½ || 0 || 0 ||  || 0 || 1 || 1 || ½ || ½ || 1 || 1 || ½ ||7 || 0 ||
|-
| 7 || align=left| || 2767 || 0 || ½ || ½ || 1 || 0 || 1 ||  || ½ || 1 || ½ || 0 || 0 || 1 || ½ ||6½ || ½ || 41.25
|-
| 8 || align=left| || 2828 || ½ || 0 || 1 || 0 || ½ || 0 || ½ ||  || ½ || 0 || ½ || 1 || 1 || 1 ||6½ || ½ || 38.75
|-
| 9 || align=left| || 2801 || ½ || ½ || 0 || 1 || ½ || 0 || 0 || ½ ||  || ½ || 1 || 0 || 1 || ½ ||6 || ½ || 38.00
|-
| 10 || align=left| || 2793 || 0 || ½ || 0 || 0 || 0 || ½ || ½ || 1 || ½ ||  || 1 || 1 || 0 || 1 ||6 || ½ || 34.50
|-
| 11 || align=left| || 2663 || 0 || ½ || 0 || 0 || 1 || ½ || 1 || ½ || 0 || 0 ||  || 1 || ½ || 0 ||5 || 1½ ||
|-
| 12 || align=left| || 2688 || ½ || ½ || 0 || 1 || 0 || 0 || 1 || 0 || 1 || 0 || 0 ||  || 1 || 0 ||5 || 1 ||
|-
| 13 || align=left| || 2714 || ½ || ½ || ½ || ½ || ½ || 0 || 0 || 0 || 0 || 1 || ½ || 0 ||  || 1 ||5 || ½ ||
|-
| 14 || align=left| || 2745 || 0 || 0 || 0 || ½ || 0 || ½ || ½ || 0 || ½ || 0 || 1 || 1 || 0 ||  ||4 || ||
|}

References

External links
 Presentation of the 2009 competition by Chessdom
 Final report of the 2010 competition by ChessBase
 Official page of the 2011 Tal Memorial (in Russian)

Chess competitions
Chess in Russia
Sports competitions in Moscow
Chess memorial tournaments
International sports competitions hosted by Russia
Recurring sporting events established in 2006
2006 establishments in Russia